Estimates of deaths in the Libyan Civil War vary with figures from 2,500 to 25,000 given between March 2 and October 2, 2011. An exact figure is hard to ascertain, partly due to a media clamp-down by the Libyan government. Some conservative estimates have been released.

Deaths caused by government forces
On February 22, the International Coalition Against War Criminals gave an estimate that 519 people had died, 3,980 were wounded and over 1,500 were missing.

Human Rights Watch has estimated that at least 233 people had been killed by February 22.

On February 23, Italian Minister of Foreign Affairs Franco Frattini stated that according to his information 1,000 people had died so far.

On February 24, the IFHR said that 130 soldiers had been executed in Benghazi and Bayda, after they mutinied and sided with the protesters.

On February 25, Navi Pillay, the High Commissioner for Human Rights of the United Nations, said that reports indicated that "thousands may have been killed or injured".

Deaths caused by rebel forces
Among the security forces there had been more than 1,700 dead, including civilians in support of the government, alleged mercenaries and government soldiers. There have been many reports that members of the security forces have been killed by both the government and the opposition.

On February 18, two policemen were hanged by protesters in Benghazi. Also, on the same day, 50 black Africans, mostly from Chad, were executed by the protesters in Bayda. Some of them were killed when protesters burned down the police station in which they locked them up and at least 15 were lynched in front of the courthouse in Bayda. The bodies of some of them were put on display and caught on video. By February 23, the government confirmed that 111 soldiers had been killed.

On February 23, a group of 22 government soldiers attempted to make a breakout from an air base near Derna, which had been under siege for days by rebel fighters. Within hours, all of them were captured and eventually 14 of them were shot execution style while a 15th was hanged by the opposition forces. Between February 15 and May 22, 37 former government loyalists were killed in Benghazi in revenge killings by some opposition groups.

Toward the end of the Battle of Misrata (February 18, 2011 – May 15, 2011), at least 27 sub-Saharan Africans from Mali, Niger or Chad, who were accused of being mercenaries, were executed by rebel forces.

Deaths caused by Coalition forces
The Libyan official sources claimed that at least between 64 and 90 people were killed during the bombardments on the first two days of the U.N. intervention and another 150 had been wounded. The Vatican news agency claimed that in Tripoli alone, at least 40 civilians died as a result of the bombing campaign. According to the Libyan Health office, the airstrikes killed 1,108 civilians and wounded 4,500 by July 13.

On April 1, NATO airstrikes killed 14 rebel fighters and wounded seven more on the frontline at Brega.
On April 7, news reports surfaced that NATO bombers killed 10–13 rebels and wounded 14–22 near the eastern oil town of Brega.
On April 27, at least one NATO warplane accidentally attacked the Libyan rebel forces position near the besieged city of Misrata, killing 12 fighters and wounding five others.
On May 13, 11 religious imams were claimed to be killed and 50 others injured when a NATO airstrike struck a large gathering in Brega praying for peace in conflict-ridden Libya.
On June 19, at least nine civilians were killed in a NATO airstrike on Tripoli. Reporters saw bodies being pulled out of a destroyed building. NATO acknowledged being responsible for the civilians' deaths.
On June 20, The then Libyan government, claimed that 15 civilians including three children had been killed by a NATO airstrike on Sorman.
On July 25, 11 civilians were claimed killed by a NATO airstrike on a medical clinic in Zliten.
On July 30, 3 journalists were killed and 15 wounded in NATO attacks against the Libyan state TV Al-Jamahiriya, which continued to broadcast after the attacks.
On August 9, the Libyan government claimed that 85 civilians were killed in NATO airstrikes on Majer, a village near Zliten. A NATO spokesman confirmed that they bombed Zliten on August 8 and 9, but said that he was unable to confirm the casualties. The Libyan government declared three days of national mourning. Reporters were later taken to a hospital where they saw at least 30 dead bodies including the bodies of at least two young children. The Libyan government claimed that the bodies of others killed in the airstrikes were taken to other hospitals. Commander of the NATO military mission in Libya, Lieutenant General Charles Bouchard said "I cannot believe that 85 civilians were present when we struck in the wee hours of the morning, and given our intelligence. But I cannot assure you that there were none at all".
 On March 2, 2012, after the conclusion of hostilities, the United Nations Human Rights Council released a comprehensive report concluding that in total 60 civilians were killed and 55 wounded by the NATO air campaign.

Legal status
On February 26, 2011, the United Nations Security Council (UNSC) stated in UNSC Resolution 1970, "the widespread and systematic attacks currently taking place in the Libyan Arab Jamahiriya against the civilian population may amount to crimes against humanity" and referred "the situation" in Libya since February 15, to the International Criminal Court (ICC), a permanent tribunal that presently can prosecute individuals for genocide, crimes against humanity or war crimes. On March 4, the ICC assigned investigation of the case to Pre-trial Chamber I, consisting of Judge Cuno Tarfusser from Italy, Judge Sylvia Steiner from Brazil and Judge Sanji Mmasenono Monageng from Botswana.

NATO Secretary General Anders Fogh Rasmussen stated on March 28 that NATO was impartial and that it interpreted the terms of UNSC Resolution 1973 on the protection of civilians to apply to both rebel and government forces. The BBC stated that "the rebels felt they had a 'private understanding' of the NATO mission, [believing] that the western world has joined them in a campaign of regime change." The NATO Secretary General described the possibility that NATO would attack rebel forces who endanger civilian populations as "hypothetical" as of the date of the interview.

Timeline of reported deaths per event

Combatant deaths 

Based on the numbers, between 5,904 and 6,626 opposition members/fighters (including some civilian supporters) and between 3,309 and 4,227 Gaddafi loyalists had been killed by October 23, 2011.

In addition, another 1,350 opposition fighters and activists have been confirmed as missing in the fighting in the east, 781–900 were reported to be missing in the Battle of Misrata, of which 163 were later confirmed dead when found in two mass graves, 136 went missing during the Nafusa Mountains Campaign, 74 were missing following the Battle of Brega–Ajdabiya road and up to 700 rebels were missing following the Battle of Bin Jawad, of which 170 were later found in a mass grave, for a total of 2,708–2,827 rebels reported missing.

In January 2013, the new Libyan government stated, based on unfinished research, that 4,700 rebel fighters and a similar number of loyalist soldiers were killed during the conflict. An estimated 2,100 rebels and loyalists were missing. No count was given on the number of killed and missing civilians.

Civilian deaths 

There had been at least 5,637 to 7,046 reported civilians killed by October 23, 2011. However, a number of civilians were also killed during the Second Battle of Benghazi and during the campaign in the Nafusa mountains, so the number could be far higher. Also, the number of civilians reported to had been killed in NATO air-strikes could be smaller because it was proven that some of the previous government-announced tolls from individual strikes were exaggerated.

Overall deaths 

In the end, according to the numbers presented, a total of 14,572 to 18,873 deaths have been reported, of which some have not been independently confirmed.

The opposition stated near the end of the war that 25,000 people had been killed and 4,000 had been reported as missing.

In January 2013, the new Libyan government, based on figures still being checked, estimated the number of killed to be actually far lower than previous estimates, with 4,700 of the dead being rebel fighters, a similar number loyalist soldiers and an undefined number civilians. An estimated 2,100 rebels and loyalists were missing.

Armed Conflict Location and Event Data Project, which compiles a database of all reported fatalities due to political violence on the African continent, listed 6,109 fatalities from 15 February to 23 October 2011, of which 1,319 prior to NATO intervention. Alan Kuperman, associate professor of Public Affairs at the University of Austin, calculated that about 1,000 Libyans, including civilians, rebels and soldiers, died between the start of the rebellion in mid-February and NATO intervention in mid-March.

The Uppsala Conflict Data Program, a public data resource that includes information on different types of organized violence (e.g. actors involved, casualties, date, location, etc.), reported that between 1,914 and 3,466 people were killed during the 2011 fighting. In addition their data shows that between 152 and 168 civilians were deliberately killed by the pro-Gaddafi forces in 2011.

A September 2015 study in the African Journal of Emergency Medicine found that 21,490 people were killed between February 2011 and February 2012 as a result of both direct (people killed in combat) and indirect deaths (damage to infrastructure and higher mortality rates).

Deaths overall
The total number of people killed includes protesters, armed belligerents, and civilians:

Notable deaths, disappearances and other cases 

Ali Hassan al-Jaber, Qatari journalist of Al Jazeera, killed
Mohammed Nabbous, Libyan journalist and founder of Libya Alhurra TV, killed
Kais al-Hilali, Libyan political cartoonist famous for painting anti-Gaddafi mural, killed
Tim Hetherington, British-American photojournalist, killed
Chris Hondros, American photojournalist, killed
Ahmed Eyzert, engineer who discovered and masterminded the "invaluable" technique of using Google Earth satellite imagery with coordinates to enhance artillery accuracy, killed
Saif al-Arab Gaddafi, son of Muammar Gaddafi, killed along with three of Gaddafi's grandchildren in a NATO air-strike
Iman al-Obeidi, Libyan postgraduate law student, alleged rape case with media and governmental response
Rana Akbani, Syrian journalist in government custody from March 28 to April 14
Anton Hammerl, South African photographer, missing and presumed killed on April 5
Manu Brabo, Spanish photographer in government custody from April 5 to May 18
James Foley, American journalist in government custody from April 5 to May 18
Clare Morgana Gillis, American journalist in government custody from April 5 to May 18
Nigel Chandler, British journalist released from government custody on May 18
Khamis Gaddafi, son of Muammar Gaddafi, killed when his vehicle was destroyed on August 29
Muammar Gaddafi, Libyan leader from 1969–2011, killed in hometown of Sirte on October 20
Mutassim Gaddafi, son of Muammar Gaddafi, killed alongside his father on October 20

See also
Casualty recording

References

First Libyan Civil War
War crimes in Libya